The  Sri Lankan High Commissioner to the Pakistan is the Sri Lankan envoy to Pakistan. Countries belonging to the Commonwealth of Nations typically exchange High Commissioners, rather than Ambassadors. Though there are a few technical differences (for instance, whereas Ambassadors present their diplomatic credentials to the host country's head of state, High Commissioners are accredited to the head of government), they are in practice one and the same office. The Sri Lankan High Commissioner to Pakistan is concurrently accredited as Ambassador to Kyrgyzstan and Tajikistan.

High Commissioners
Sir Razik Fareed
Major General Anton Muttukumaru
Major General H. W. G. Wijeyekoon
Dr Tuan Burhanudeen Jayah
Air Chief Marshal Jayalath Weerakkody
Dr W. B. Dorakumbure
Austin Jayawardhana
Theja Gunawardene
General G.H De Silva
General Srilal Weerasooriya
Alfred K. David (1998-2000)
Dr  Dharmasena Attygalle
Hugh Fernando
Oscar de Livera
Major General Jayanath Lokuketagodage
Vice Admiral Mohan Wijewickrama

See also
List of heads of missions from Sri Lanka

References
The High Commission of Sri Lanka

Sri Lanka

Pakistan